Patricia Ann Keating (born July 20, 1952) is an American linguist and noted phonetician.  She is distinguished research professor emeritus at UCLA.

Life
She received her PhD in Linguistics at Brown University in 1980. In 1980 she joined the faculty of the Linguistics Department at University of California, Los Angeles, where she remained until her retirement. She became a Full Professor and director of the UCLA Phonetics Laboratory in 1991. She also held a position as Distinguished Professor and served as Chair of UCLA Linguistics Department.

Keating is best known for two areas of research in phonetics.  She is, with Cécile Fougeron, the discoverer of the initial strengthening effect, wherein consonants receive more fortis articulations (greater degree of articulatory contact) to the extent that they occur at the beginnings of high-ranking phonological phrases.  On the theoretical side, she is the inventor of the "window model" of coarticulation, a theory of phonetic realization that specifies a particular range of legal values for each segment along each  phonetic parameter.

Keating is a founding member of the Association for Laboratory Phonology and was President of the International Phonetic Association from 2015 to 2019.

Keating is married to linguist Bruce Hayes.

Selected publications
Fougeron, Cécile and Keating, Patricia A. (1997) Articulatory strengthening at edges of prosodic domains.  Journal of the Acoustical Society of America 101: 3728–3740.
Keating, Patricia A. (1990) The window model of coarticulation : articulatory evidence . In Papers in laboratory phonology I (John Kingston & Mary E. Beckman, eds.). Cambridge : Cambridge University Press, 451–470.

References

External links 
Homepage at UCLA
UCLA Phonetics Laboratory

Living people
1952 births
Brown University alumni
University of California, Los Angeles faculty
Women linguists
American phonologists
Phoneticians
Distinguished professors in the United States
Fellows of the Linguistic Society of America